Vaanchinathan is a 2001 Indian Tamil-language action film directed by Shaji Kailas in his Tamil debut. The script was written by Liaquat Ali Khan. It stars Vijayakanth, Sakshi Shivanand, Ramya Krishnan and Prakash Raj in pivotal roles. The film was released on 14 January 2001.

Plot
Vanchinathan is a cop who has been transferred from Gujarat. Chidambaram is a media mogul who thrives on chaos and confusion, which will help him boost sales of his paper. Their enmity becomes personal when Chidambaram challenges Vanchinathan to arrest him when he cleverly commits a murder in broad daylight in front of Vanchinathan.

Cast

Production
The team had initially agreed terms with Suresh Gopi to feature in a pivotal role, but his unavailability led to team casting Prakash Raj. Soundarya was to appear in the film, but later opted out due to unknown reasons. Shilpa Shetty had also signed on to star in the film. Likewise, Nadhiya was expected to make a return to Tamil films through the project, but eventually went against doing so.

A fight scene involving Vijayakanth, Ramya Krishnan and rowdies was shot in a set erected at AVM studios. The song sequence, 'Amul Baby', was shot at New Zealand.

Soundtrack
Music was composed by Karthik Raja, collaborating with Vijayakanth for the second time after Alexander.

Release
The film released on 14 January 2001 and opened to mixed reviews. Rediff wrote "But the masala is appetising and in the final analysis, that is all that counts". Similarly, Lolluexpress claimed that film is a "collection of scenes from actor's previous movies". The Hindu wrote "Liyakath Ali Khan's story and screenplay are crisp and action-packed" and also noted " sequences remind you of the Parthiban starrer `Abhimanyu' or Vijayakanth's own ``Vallarasu''".
Distributors who had bought the film had incurred heavy losses. Post release it was rumoured that footage of two heroines have been deleted to reduce the timing which earned criticism.

References

External links

Films set in India
Police detective films
Indian crime action films
2000s crime action films
Indian vigilante films
2001 films
2000s Tamil-language films
Fictional portrayals of the Tamil Nadu Police
Films scored by Karthik Raja
Films directed by Shaji Kailas